John Walters (born July 18, 1963) is an American rower. He competed in the men's coxed four event at the 1988 Summer Olympics.

References

External links
 

1963 births
Living people
American male rowers
Olympic rowers of the United States
Rowers at the 1988 Summer Olympics
Sportspeople from Portland, Oregon